Teja Oblak (born December 20, 1990) is a professional Slovenian basketball player for ZVVZ USK Praha and the Slovenian national team. She began her basketball career in her hometown Škofja Loka, playing eight years for her local team Odeja Škofja Loka. In Euroleague, she combined one season in Polkowice with three seasons for Good Angels Košice and one season in Atomerömü KSC Szekszard and in 2018, she moved to ZVVZ USK Praha. 

She participated at the EuroBasket Women 2017.

She is the older sister of Jan Oblak, a professional football goalkeeper for Atlético Madrid and the Slovenia national team.

References

1990 births
Living people
Slovenian women's basketball players
Sportspeople from Kranj
Point guards
Slovenian expatriate sportspeople in Slovakia
Slovenian people of Bosnia and Herzegovina descent 
Slovenian people of Serbian descent
Slovenian expatriate basketball people in the Czech Republic
Slovenian expatriate basketball people in Poland
Expatriate basketball people in Slovakia
Slovenian expatriate sportspeople in Hungary
Expatriate basketball people in Hungary